Mercury 5 or variants may refer to:

Mercury 5, a spacecraft of Project Mercury
Mercury V, a version of the Bristol Mercury aircraft engine

See also
Mercury-Atlas 5, a 1961 unmanned space flight